The  is the 16th edition of the IFMAR 1:10 Electric Off-Road World Championship for 1:10 scale radio-controlled electric off-road buggies sanctioned by the International Federation of Model Auto Racing (IFMAR). It was run over two separate classes (2WD and 4WD) over eight days from 3 to 10 October, with each class running for three days each in total.

The national sanctioning body, Japan Model Racing Car Association (JMRCA), acted as the host nation on behalf of the Far East Model Car Association (FEMCA), with JMRCA Kanto acting as the host club for the championship taking place at the Yatabe Arena in Tsukuba in Ibaraki Prefecture. This was the arena's third time hosting the event and its second time hosting a 1:10 off-road race, the first since the 1995 event. It also became the first Off-Road Worlds to take place in an indoor venue since 1999.

The event was best known for its decision to be run on artificial turf for the first time, ending a tradition of dirt tracks in the tournament's entire 30-year history, a decision that has not been met without controversy. As a result of this controversy, the decision became known as "Astrogate" and the event as "Turf Worlds".

Jared Tebo and Steven Hartson, both of the United States, were the defending champions of the 2WD and 4WD class respectively. The 2WD class was won by Team Associated's Spencer Rivkin who, at the age of 16, became the youngest driver to win the 1:10 off-road race. After losing to Naoto Matsukura in electric touring car when he won the last two of three heats needed to secure a title the previous year, XRAY's Bruno Coelho of Portugal won the 4WD class.

Background 
During the annual general meeting for electric racing on September 26, when the Off-Road Worlds was still in session, Yatabe Arena was awarded hosting rights under IFMAR's bloc host rotation order as it turned to FEMCA, who represents Asia,

This was the Yokomo owned venue's third IFMAR event, its first was as a 1:10 electric off-road championship in 1995. They also hosted the 2000 Electric On-Road Worlds (1:12, PRO 10, touring car), the only time three official world championship events took place under the same host. Beside the Worlds, the circuit regularly hosts the JMRCA All-Japan Championships.

Circuit 

The circuit was originally famously built by Yokomo as a replica of the circuit used for the 1989 Worlds in Australia to help themselves prepare for the race three months prior, using soil samples collected from the track. The circuit was at the time built over a large plastic awning. The venue was reopened in 2011 following a major refurbishment work which included a new permanent building that was built.

There are currently four circuits in total, one is used for off-road racing in its original building, three others are on-road circuits housed under the new building, two are used as a drift circuit and the other used for on-road carpet racing.

When Yatabe Arena was given the right to host the world championship following the 2013 Worlds; at the time, the rulebook stated that the choice of surface was packable rock free dirt but a proposal was sent to IFMAR to run the event on artificial turf. On December 15, 2014, the rules was reamended to allow for the track to be entirely run on artificial turf following a vote by the four continental blocs with only ROAR of North America opposing, with some traditionalists branding this decision to run the world championship on a "touring car track with jumps" and in a public poll conducted by the NeoBuggy website, 62% of readers opposed the decision. The reason for this decision was in response to the rise of professional carpet racing for off-road racing, particularly in Europe, with its highly successful , a winter multi-round professional championship taking place on indoor carpet tracks.

As off-road racing has traditionally taken place on dirt track, artificial turf in off-road racing is considered to be easy to set up, durable and easier to maintain and thus became a choice surface over dirt, with manufacturers producing parts and cars designed for racing on this type of high-grip surface. Also, it enables events to take place in commercial venues such as shopping malls.

Instead of using the existing track, a new track will be temporarily built over its indoor on-road circuit in the venue's newly built extension, the Center Building; to achieve this, the track require two layers of wooden sheeting put underneath the new surface to enable the piping, strips and corner dots to be screwed securely to the track. Because of it being an indoor venue, it is the first Off-Road Worlds to take place in an indoor venue since 1999 which took place in Finland.

The overall dimension of the track is 21.5m deep by 38m wide. The circuit was extensively modified from the track originally used in the pre-Worlds based on feedback from competitors that was criticized for "lacking obstacles". The most significant additions from the IFMAR warm-up race is the inclusion of the large tabletop, originally built but was left out by the organizers. Another change made for the two events was that the main straight was relocated front of the drivers stand to the opposite side of the track.

During the first day of racing, many of the drivers praised the overall layout some more positive than initially thought but criticized the circuit's five washboard section, with some branding it "stupid" especially from Jörn Neumann and Ryan Maifield and it being too high however the sections was praised by a few drivers including the defending 2WD champion, Jared Tebo who claimed it encouraged driver errors. The strips consisted of five black rubber strips placed underneath house doors, designed to force drivers to set their car to off-road racing ground clearance. Four times world champion Ryan Cavalieri praised the track, describing it "fun except for the black strips".

Dates
The date was initially was to take place on September 26 through October 3 but a decision was made that it have to be moved forward 7 days to prevent a date clash with the prestigious  in Tokyo as a number of important JMRCA officials are required to be present at the show

Tires
Schumacher Racing Products have been announced as the sole supplier of control tires for the world championships. The tire used will be Mini Spike 2 Yellow compound with Med. Rear CAT foam insert for both 2WD and 4WD with Wide Stagger Rib Yellow compound with Med. Front CAT insert for the 4WD front.

Report

2WD results

4WD results

Entries 

A number of federations submitted their entry lists in August. The Association of Australia Radio Controlled Model Car Club (AARCMCC) announced in August that they will be sending nine drivers. Remotely Operated Auto Racers (ROAR), representing the North America intended to send 15 drivers with all but one (who is a Canadian) from the United States, half of its allocation total. European Federation of Radio Operated Model Automobiles (EFRA) sent 58 drivers but with late cancellations and no-shows, 48 drivers competed. British Radio Car Association (BRCA), representing the United Kingdom, being the majority being the most with 12 drivers followed by Federation Française de Voitures Radio Commandees (FFVRC), representing France, with 7.

The most entries per country is the Japan Model Racing Car Association (JMRCA) with a total of 54 entries Fourth Association of Model Auto Racing (FAMAR), representing South Africa, South America and the rest of the world did not send any drivers.

See also
Previous IFMAR Worlds previously taking place in Yatabe Arena
 1995 IFMAR 1:10 Electric Off-Road World Championship
 2000 Electric On-Road World Championships
 2000 IFMAR 1:12 On-Road World Championship
 2000 IFMAR PRO 10 World Championship
 2000 IFMAR ISTC World Championship

References
 Citations

Bibliography

External links 

 
 Official page Archive
 
 

IFMAR 1:10 Electric Off-Road World Championship
IFMAR 1:10 Electric Off-Road World Championship
International sports competitions hosted by Japan